Kim Tae-yeon (born January 3, 1976) is a South Korean actress. She began her entertainment career as a model, winning Model Line's 40th Fashion Model contest in 1996 and the Pantene Model contest sponsored by Ford Models in 2000. Kim made her film debut in the highly controversial film Lies in 1999.

Filmography

Film
Foolish Game (2004)
Love Her (2001)
Lies (1999)

Television series
Modern Housewives  (MBC, 2007)
Drama City "Shocking Marriage"  (KBS2, 2006)
Can Love Be Refilled? (KBS2, 2005)
When a Man Is in Love (SBS, 2004)
Jang Gil-san (SBS, 2004)
Traveling Women (SBS, 2004)
MBC Best Theater "The Luncheon on the Grass"  (MBC, 2004)
MBC Best Theater "Cinderella"  (MBC, 2003)
Drama City "The Reason I'm Getting Married"  (KBS2, 2003)
Scent of a Man (MBC, 2003)
Thousand Years of Love (SBS, 2003)
All In (2003)
Love Story (SBS, 1999) (episode 5: "Rose")

Music video
Freestyle - "Party Time" (1999)

Radio
Film and Music Room  (BBS Radio, 2007) - DJ

References

External links
Kim Tae-yeon Fan Cafe at Daum 

Living people
South Korean radio actresses
South Korean film actresses
South Korean television actresses
South Korean female models
1976 births